Melchor Gastón Ferrer (August 25, 1917 – June 2, 2008) was an American actor, director, producer and screenwriter. He achieved prominence on Broadway before scoring notable film hits with Scaramouche, Lili and Knights of the Round Table. He starred opposite his wife, actress Audrey Hepburn, in War and Peace, and produced her film Wait Until Dark. He also acted extensively in European films, and appeared in several cult hits, including The Antichrist (1974), The Suspicious Death of a Minor (1975), The Black Corsair (1976), and Nightmare City (1980).

Early life
Ferrer was born in Elberon, New Jersey, of Spanish and Irish descent. His father, Dr. José María Ferrer (December 3, 1857 – February 23, 1920), was born in Havana, Cuba, of Catalan ancestry. José was an authority on pneumonia and served as chief of staff of St. Vincent's Hospital in New York City. He was 59 years old at the time of Mel's birth and died three years later. Mel Ferrer's US-born mother, Mary Matilda Irene (née O'Donohue; January 28, 1878 – February 19, 1967), was a daughter of coffee broker Joseph J. O'Donohue, New York's City Commissioner of Parks, a founder of the Coffee Exchange, and a founder of the Brooklyn-New York Ferry. An ardent opponent of Prohibition, Irene Ferrer (as she was known) was named in 1934 as the New York State chairman of the Citizens Committee for Sane Liquor Laws. His parents married on October 17, 1910, in New York.

His mother's family, the O'Donohues, were prominent Roman Catholics. Ferrer's aunt, Marie Louise O'Donohue, was named a papal countess, and his mother's sister, Teresa Riley O'Donohue, a leading figure in American Roman Catholic charities and welfare organizations, was granted permission by Pope Pius XI to install a private chapel in her New York City apartment.

Ferrer had three siblings. His elder sister, Dr. María Irené Ferrer (July 30, 1915 – November 12, 2004), was a cardiologist and educator, who helped refine the cardiac catheter and electrocardiogram. She died in 2004 in Manhattan, New York City, New York, at age 89 of pneumonia and congestive heart failure. Their brother, Dr. Jose M. Ferrer (November 23, 1912 – December 24, 1982), was a surgeon; he died at age 70 from complications of abdominal surgery. Their younger sister, Teresa Ferrer (March 30, 1919 – February 12, 2002), was the religion editor of The New York Herald Tribune and an education editor for Newsweek. She died at age 82 from a thoracic aneurysm.

Ferrer was privately educated at the Bovée School in New York (where one of his classmates was the future author Louis Auchincloss) and Canterbury Prep School in Connecticut. He attended Princeton University until his sophomore year, when he dropped out to devote more time to acting.

He worked as an editor of a small Vermont newspaper and wrote the children's book Tito's Hats (Garden City Publishing, 1940).

Career

Early theatre work
Ferrer began acting in summer stock as a teenager and in 1937 won the Theatre Intime award for best new play by a Princeton undergraduate; the play was called Awhile to Work and co-starred another college student, Frances Pilchard, who would become Ferrer's first wife later the same year. At age twenty-one, he was appearing on the Broadway stage as a chorus dancer, making his debut there as an actor two years later. He appeared as a chorus dancer in two unsuccessful musicals, Cole Porter's You Never Know and Everywhere I Roam. After a bout with polio, Ferrer worked as a disc jockey in Texas and Arkansas and moved to Mexico to work on the novel Tito's Hat (published 1940).

His first acting roles were in a revival of Kind Lady (1940) and Cue for Passion (1940).

Columbia Pictures
Ferrer was contracted to Columbia Pictures as a director, along with several other "potentials" who began as dialogue directors: Fred Sears, William Castle, Henry Levin and Robert Gordon.

Among the films he worked on were Louisiana Hayride (1944), They Live in Fear (1944), Sergeant Mike (1944), Together Again (1944), Meet Miss Bobby Socks (1944), Let's Go Steady (1944), Ten Cents a Dance (1945), and A Thousand and One Nights (1945). Some of these were "B" movies but others (Thousand and One Nights) were more prestigious. Ferrer directed The Girl of the Limberlost (1945), starring Ruth Nelson.

Broadway
Eventually, he returned to Broadway, where he starred in Strange Fruit (1945–46), a play based on the novel by Lillian Smith. It was directed by José Ferrer (no relation). He then directed José Ferrer in the 1946 stage production of Cyrano de Bergerac. He worked as an assistant on The Fugitive (1947), directed by John Ford in Mexico. Along with Gregory Peck, Dorothy McGuire and Joseph Cotten, he founded the La Jolla Playhouse in San Diego.

Screen actor
Ferrer made his screen acting debut with a starring role in Lost Boundaries (1949), playing a black person who passes for white. The film was controversial but much acclaimed.

Howard Hughes' RKO Studios

Ferrer had a supporting role in Born to Be Bad (1950) at RKO, directed by Nicholas Ray. At that studio, he directed Claudette Colbert in The Secret Fury (1950) and directed or co-directed Vendetta (1950), The Racket (1951) and Macao (1952). He starred as a bullfighter in The Brave Bulls (1951) for Robert Rossen at Columbia. Ferrer fought with Arthur Kennedy over Marlene Dietrich in Rancho Notorious (1952), directed by Fritz Lang at RKO.

MGM
Ferrer went to MGM, replacing Fernando Lamas as the villain in Scaramouche (1952). The film, particularly notable for a long, climactic sword fight between Ferrer and Stewart Granger, was a huge hit. The studio kept him on for Lili (1953) as the title character (played by Leslie Caron)'s love interest. It was another big success; Ferrer and Caron also got a hit single out of it, "Hi-Lili-Hi-Lo". Saadia (1953), which Ferrer made with Cornel Wilde, was a flop, but Knights of the Round Table (1954), in which Ferrer played King Arthur, was another hit. Ferrer met actress Audrey Hepburn at a party; she wanted to do a play together. They appeared in Ondine (1954) on Broadway and wed in 1954.

Europe
Ferrer went to Italy to make Proibito (1954) and to England for Oh... Rosalinda!! (1955), directed by Powell and Pressburger. Neither film was widely seen, but War and Peace (1956) was a big success; Ferrer played Prince Andrei, co-starring with then-wife Audrey Hepburn. In France, he co-starred with Ingrid Bergman in Elena and Her Men (1956), directed by Jean Renoir.

United States
Ferrer and Hepburn made Mayerling (1957) for American television; it was released theatrically in some countries. Ferrer returned to MGM to make The Vintage (1957) with Pier Angeli, which was a big flop. He made two films for 20th Century Fox: an all-star adaptation of The Sun Also Rises (1957) and Fräulein (1958), a war story with Dana Wynter. At MGM, he played one of the last three people on Earth in The World, the Flesh and the Devil (1959), another flop. Ferrer went to Italy to star in Roger Vadim's vampire movie Blood and Roses (1960). After an English horror film, The Hands of Orlac (1960), he starred in the Italian adventure film Charge of the Black Lancers (1962). He was one of several stars in The Devil and the Ten Commandments (1962) and The Longest Day (1962). He had a cameo in his wife's Paris When It Sizzles (1964) and was Marcus Aurelius Cleander in The Fall of the Roman Empire (1964).

Television
Ferrer then turned to television, doing some directing for the series The Farmer's Daughter (1963–66) starring Inger Stevens, William Windom, and Cathleen Nesbitt. Ferrer had a supporting role in Sex and the Single Girl (1964). From 1981 to 1984, he appeared opposite Jane Wyman as Angela Channing's attorney (and briefly her husband), Phillip Erikson, on Falcon Crest (as well as directing several episodes). He played a blackmailing reporter in the Columbo episode "Requiem for a Fallen Star", starring Anne Baxter. He appeared opposite Cyd Charisse in an episode of the long-running Angela Lansbury series, Murder She Wrote, and appeared in two television miniseries, Peter the Great (1986) and Dream West (1986). Later credits include Eye of the Widow (1991) and Catherine the Great (1995).

Producer
Ferrer produced and starred in the biopic El Greco (1966), playing the famous painter. He also produced Wait Until Dark (1967), starring his wife, another big hit.

He and Hepburn divorced in 1968.

Later acting career
Ferrer was mostly a jobbing actor in the 1970s, working much in Italy. Among his credits were A Time for Loving (1972); The Antichrist (1974) in Italy; Brannigan (1974), a crime drama set in London that starred John Wayne; Silent Action (1975) and The Suspicious Death of a Minor (1975), both for Sergio Martino; The Net (1975), shot in Germany; The Black Corsair (1976), an Italian swashbuckler; Gangbuster (1977) in Italy; The Pyjama Girl Case (1977); Seagulls Fly Low (1977).

In the U.S., he was in Hi-Riders (1978), The Norseman (1978), Guyana: Crime of the Century (1979), and The Fifth Floor (1979). In 1979, he portrayed Dr. Brogli in an episode of Return of the Saint. In Europe, he was in The Visitor (1979), Island of the Fishmen (1980), Nightmare City (1980), The Great Alligator River (1980) and Eaten Alive! (1980). He went to Germany for Lili Marleen (1981). He worked in two of Spanish actress Marisol's film vehicles: Cabriola and La chica del molino rojo, being the director of the first and acting in the second.

For his contributions to the motion picture industry, Mel Ferrer has a star on the Hollywood Walk of Fame at 6268 Hollywood Blvd.

Personal life
Ferrer married five times, to four women, with whom he had six children. His wives were:
 Frances Gunby Pilchard, his first and third wife, an actress who became a sculptor. They married in 1937, and divorced in 1939 after having one child together, who died before their divorce.
 Barbara C. Tripp, whom Ferrer married in 1940 and later divorced. They had two children: daughter Mela Ferrer (born 1943) and son Christopher Ferrer (born 1944).
 Frances Gunby Pilchard, for the 2nd time; they remarried in 1944, and divorced in 1953, after having two more children together: Pepa Philippa Ferrer (born 1941, conceived during his marriage with Tripp) and Mark Young Ferrer (born 1944).
Audrey Hepburn, to whom he was married from 1954 until 1968. They had one son, Sean Hepburn Ferrer (born 1960).
 Elizabeth , from Belgium, to whom he was married from 1971 to his death in 2008.

Before his marriage to Elizabeth Soukhotine in 1971, Ferrer had a relationship with 29-year-old interior designer Tessa Kennedy.

Besides English, Ferrer was also fluent in Spanish and French.

Death 
A resident of Carpinteria, California, Ferrer died of heart failure at a convalescent home in Santa Barbara, California on June 2, 2008, at age 90.

Filmography

Actor

Film

Television

Director

Dialogue coach

Radio

Notes

References

External links

Mel Ferrer, a Reluctant Movie Star, Dies at 90

1917 births
2008 deaths
American male film actors
American male stage actors
Male actors from New Jersey
Hispanic and Latino American male actors
American people of Cuban descent
American people of Irish descent
American people of Spanish descent
People from Long Branch, New Jersey
People with polio
People from Carpinteria, California
20th-century American male actors
Canterbury School (Connecticut) alumni
American male television actors
American film producers
American theatre directors
American film directors
American television directors